Batillaria multiformis is a species of sea snail, a marine gastropod mollusk in the family Batillariidae.

References

External links

Batillariidae
Gastropods described in 1869
Marine gastropods